Arsi Ilari Harju (born March 18, 1974) is a Finnish former track and field athlete who competed in the shot put. He won the gold medal at the 2000 Summer Olympics in Sydney. He set his personal best of 21.39 in the qualification. In the final, Harju secured the gold medal with his second round shot put of 21.29, beating silver medalist Adam Nelson by 8 cm and bronze medalist John Godina by 9 cm. In 2000, Harju was also named the Finnish Sports Personality of the Year.

Harju was the 12th member to be inducted into the 20 metre club after achieving the distance of 20.16 on March 2, 1997, in Tampere, Finland.

Harju was a patron of UNICEF School walks in Finland.

Harju retired from international competitions after the season 2005. He competed again from 2011 to 2012 marking 18.48 as his season best in both years.

Major achievements

References
 
 Arsi Harju's webpage on the Perhon Kiri site
 Finnish Championships on gbrathletics.com

1974 births
Living people
People from Kurikka
Finnish male shot putters
Olympic gold medalists for Finland
Olympic athletes of Finland
Athletes (track and field) at the 1996 Summer Olympics
Athletes (track and field) at the 2000 Summer Olympics
World Athletics Championships medalists
UNICEF Goodwill Ambassadors
Medalists at the 2000 Summer Olympics
Olympic gold medalists in athletics (track and field)
Sportspeople from South Ostrobothnia